The 1952 Southern Conference baseball tournament was held in Raleigh, North Carolina, from May 15 through 18. The South Division's top seed Duke won their second tournament title. Duke coach Jack Coombs spent the tournament in the hospital with a kidney ailment. He would retire after the school year.

Seeding 
The top two teams from each division participated in the tournament. The table below represents the most complete conference standings available, but the teams below all fielded baseball teams within the Southern Conference.

Bracket

References 

Southern Conference Baseball Tournament
Tournament